Uritsky District is an administrative and municipal district (raion), one of the twenty-four in Oryol Oblast, Russia. It is located in the west of the oblast. Its administrative center is the urban locality (an urban-type settlement) of Naryshkino. Population: 18,666 (2010 Census);  The population of Naryshkino accounts for 51.3% of the district's total population.

References

Notes

Sources

Districts of Oryol Oblast